Hanjarak-e Bala (also Romanized as Hanjarak-e Bālā; also known as Hajrak, Hanjarak, and Khanjarak) is a village in Khabar Rural District, Dehaj District, Shahr-e Babak County, Kerman Province, Iran. At the 2006 census, its population was 42, in 9 families.

References 

Populated places in Shahr-e Babak County